Gymnoscelis confusata is a moth in the family Geometridae. It is found on Borneo and Peninsular Malaysia and in Singapore and possibly India.

References

Moths described in 1866
Gymnoscelis